International Association of Chiefs of Police (IACP) is a  nonprofit organization based in Alexandria, Virginia (United States). It is the world's largest professional association for police leaders.

Mission and vision

Mission 
The International Association of Chiefs of Police advances the policing profession through advocacy, research, outreach, and education.

Vision 
IACP's vision is centered on shaping the future of the policing profession.

Overview

The International Association of Chiefs of Police is a not-for-profit 501c(3) organization headquartered in Alexandria, Virginia. The IACP is the publisher of the Police Chief magazine, the leading periodical for law enforcement executives, and the host of the IACP Annual Conference and Exposition, the largest police educational and technology exposition in the world.

The IACP is the world’s largest professional association for police leaders. It has over 31,000 members in over 165 countries. Despite its name, membership in the organization is open to law enforcement professionals of all ranks, as well people who are not police officers but are affiliated with law enforcement. Active membership, in which members have the right to vote to determine official organization policy and elect association officers at the Annual Conference and Exposition, is available only to chiefs and superintendents of police and command-level police officers. Associate membership, in which the members have all the rights of active members except for the right to vote or run for office as association officers, is available to non-command level officers, civilian employees of law enforcement agencies, and others involved with law enforcement including those instructors/researchers in criminal justice or related fields working at academic institutions, students enrolled in a criminal justice course or related course, private and corporate security, private detectives, those in the medical/psychological professions, associations and nonprofits, and employees of companies assisting or providing services to law enforcement.

Leadership
IACP presidents have included:
 John Letteney (current)
 Dwight Henninger 
 Cynthia Renaud
 Steven Casstevens 
 Paul Cell 
 Louis Dekmar
 Donald De Lucca
 Terrence Cunningham
 Richard Beary

Executive directors have included Quinn Tamm.

References

External links

Organizations based in Alexandria, Virginia
Organizations established in 1893
International law enforcement organizations
Law enforcement non-governmental organizations in the United States
Law enforcement-related professional associations